This is a list of military divisions of all nationalities that are identified by name. In many armies divisions have been given both a name and a number; they are listed here if they are commonly referred to by name in English publications.

Note that in the British Army prior to April 1915 many Regular Army and Territorial Army divisions were designated by name.  After April 1915 all divisions were assigned a number.  For example, the East Lancashire Division became the 42nd Division.

 ANZAC Mounted Division
 Australian Mounted Division (formerly Imperial Mounted Division)
 Australian Jungle Division
 British Devon and Cornwall County Division (later 77th Infantry Division)
 British Dorset County Division
 British Durham and North Riding County Division
 British Essex County Division (formerly West Sussex County Division)
 British Guards Division
 British Guards Armoured Division
 British Hampshire County Division
 British King's Division
 British Light Division
 British Lincolnshire County Division
 British Norfolk County Division (later 78th Infantry Division)
 British Northumberland County Division
 British Prince of Wales' Division
 British Queens Division
 British Royal Marines Division
 British Royal Naval Division
 British Scottish Division
 British West Sussex County Division (later Essex County Division)
 British Yeomanry Mounted Division (later 4th Cavalry Division)
 British Yorkshire County Division
 German Großdeutschland Division
 German Luftwaffe Hermann Göring Division (later Hermann Göring Panzer Division, 1st Hermann Göring Parachute Panzer Division)
 German Luftwaffe 2nd Hermann Göring Parachute Panzergrenadier Division
 German Luftwaffe Erdmann Parachute Division (later 7th Parachute Division)
 German Luftwaffe Meindl Division (later 21st Luftwaffe Field Division)
 German Panzer Division Kempf
 German Panzer Division Kurmark
 German Panzer Division Müncheberg
 German Panzer-Lehr-Division
 German SS Division Nord (later 6th SS Mountain Division)
 German SS Totenkopf Division (later 3rd SS Division)
 German Fortress Division Kreta
 German Fortress Division Swinemünde
 Imperial German Alpenkorps
 Imperial German Guard Ersatz Division
 Israeli Gaza Division
 Israeli West Bank Division
 New Zealand and Australian Division
 New Zealand Division
 US Americal Division
 US Philippine Division
 Vietnam Silvergrass Division (Sư đoàn Bông lau)
 Vietnam Victory Division (Sư đoàn Chiến Thắng)
 Vietnam Vanguard Division (Sư đoàn Tiên Phong)
 Vietnam Glory Division (Sư đoàn Vinh Quang)
 Vietnam Lam Hong Division (Sư đoàn Lam Hồng)
 Vietnam Delta Division (Sư đoàn Đồng Bằng)
 Vietnam Ngu Binh Division (Sư đoàn Ngự Bình)
 Vietnam Binh Tri Thien Division (Sư đoàn Bình Trị Thiên)
 Vietnam Lam River Division (Sư đoàn Sông Lam)
 351st Artillery-Engineer Division (Vietnam)
 Vietnam Dak To Division (Sư đoàn Đắc Tô)
 Vietnam Golden Star Division (Sư đoàn Sao Vàng)
 Vietnam Thang Long Air Division (Sư đoàn Không quân Thăng Long)
 Vietnam Hai Van Air Division (Sư đoàn Không quân Hải Vân)
 Vietnam Le Loi Air Division (Sư đoàn Không quân Lê Lợi)
 Vietnam Ha Noi Air Defense Division (Sư đoàn Phòng không Hà Nội)
 Vietnam Hai Phong Air Defense Division (Sư đoàn Phòng không Hải Phòng)
 Vietnam Bac Thai Air Defense Division (Sư đoàn Phòng không Bắc Thái)
 Vietnam Da Nang Air Defense Division (Sư đoàn Phòng không Đà Nẵng)
 Vietnam Khanh Hoa Air Defense Division (Sư đoàn Phòng không Khánh Hòa)
 Vietnam Ho Chi Minh City Air Defense Division (Sư đoàn Phòng không Thành phố Hồ Chí Minh)

See also 

 List of military divisions by number

name